Plucky may refer to:

 Plucky Duck, a fictional anthropomorphic green duck in the animated series Tiny Toon Adventures

See also

 Plucking (disambiguation)